Tarik Chaoufi (born 26 February 1986) is a Moroccan professional road racing cyclist, who currently rides for UCI Continental team .

Major results

2006
 10th Overall Tour du Maroc
2008
 1st Prix du Printemps
2009
 1st Stage 3 Tour d'Egypte
 1st Stage 8 Tour des Aéroports
 4th Overall Tour du Faso
 6th Overall Tour du Rwanda
 9th Grand Prix of Sharm-el-Sheikh
2010
 Les Challenges de la Marche Verte
1st GP Al Massira
3rd GP Sakia El Hamra
5th GP Oued Eddahab
 1st Stage 8 Tour du Rwanda
 3rd Road race, National Road Championships
 7th Emirates Cup
 10th Overall Tour du Mali
1st Stage 4
2011
 1st Maria Grand Prix Orlando
 1st Stage 6 Tour du Maroc
 Challenge du Prince
2nd Trophée de l'Anniversaire
3rd Trophée de la Maison Royale
5th Trophée Princier
 Challenge des phosphates
3rd Challenge Youssoufia
4th Challenge Ben Guerir
 4th Overall Tour d'Algérie
 10th Overall Kwita Izina Cycling Tour
2012
 1st  Road race, National Road Championships
 1st Overall 2011–12 UCI Africa Tour
 Les Challenges de la Marche Verte
1st GP Sakia El Hamra
2nd GP Oued Eddahab
4th GP Al Massira
 Challenge des phosphates
1st Challenge Khouribga
6th Challenge Youssoufia
 Challenge du Prince
1st Trophée Princier
2nd Trophée de la Maison Royale
3rd Trophée de l'Anniversaire
 1st Stage 7 Tour du Maroc
 La Tropicale Amissa Bongo
1st Mountains classification
1st Stage 4
2013
 7th Road race, National Road Championships
2014
 Challenge du Prince
1st Trophée de la Maison Royale
2nd Trophée de l'Anniversaire
 2nd Critérium International d'Alger
 3rd Road race, National Road Championships
 9th GP Al Massira, Les Challenges de la Marche Verte
 10th Grand Prix d'Oran
2015
 Challenge du Prince
2nd Trophée de la Maison Royale
6th Trophée Princier
8th Trophée de l'Anniversaire

References

External links
 Profile at Euskaltel-Euskadi's official website
 

Moroccan male cyclists
1986 births
Living people
People from Azrou